Jauchelette is a village of Wallonia and a district of the municipality of Jodoigne, located in the province of Walloon-Brabant, Belgium. 

The village lies next to the Grand Gette (Djåce in Walloon) and the name means Small Gette (Jauche is the French form for Djåce). The Abbaye de la Ramée was founded here in 1215.

Jodoigne
Former municipalities of Walloon Brabant